Maloarslangulovo (Bäläkäy Arıślanğol) is a rural locality (a village) in Abishevsky Selsoviet, Khaybullinsky District, Bashkortostan, Russia. The population was 351 as of 2010. There are 5 streets.

Geography 
Maloarslangulovo is located 72 km west of Akyar (the district's administrative centre) by road. Bolsheabishevo is the nearest rural locality.

References 

Rural localities in Khaybullinsky District